Lyle Lovett and His Large Band is Lyle Lovett's third album, released in 1989. Lovett won the Grammy Award for Best Male Country Vocal Performance for the album.

Lovett's cover of Tammy Wynette's "Stand By Your Man" was later included in the soundtrack of the 1992 movie The Crying Game.

Production
The album incorporated more of a big band-influenced sound than Lovett's previous albums.

Chart performance
Lyle Lovett and His Large Band reached number 10 on Billboard's chart for Top Country Albums, and 62 on the Billboard Hot 200.

Critical reception
Robert Christgau called the album "very humorous," writing that "after kicking off with a sharp r&b instrumental, the lapsed grad student dispenses with pretension and boils country down to the basics." Trouser Press wrote: "In rock’n’roll’s 40 disreputable years only Randy Newman has produced such adult music, or brought such irreproachable aesthetics to the task of charting moral sleight of hand." The New Yorker wrote that "Lovett reveals his weird splendor in a schizophrenic jumble of smoky jazz and twangy country that revives whole swaths of neglected popular American music."

Track listing
All tracks composed by Lyle Lovett, except where indicated

 "The Blues Walk (Instrumental)" (Clifford Brown) – 2:25 
 "Here I Am"  – 4:01 
 "Cryin' Shame"  – 2:28 
 "Good Intentions"  – 3:13 
 "I Know You Know"  – 3:57 
 "What Do You Do/The Glory of Love"  (Billy Hill, Lovett) – 3:06 
 "I Married Her Just Because She Looks Like You"  – 3:14 
 "Stand by Your Man"  (Billy Sherrill, Tammy Wynette) – 2:44 
 "Which Way Does That Old Pony Run"  – 4:08 
 "Nobody Knows Me"  – 3:06 
 "If You Were to Wake Up"  – 4:07 
 "Once Is Enough"  – 4:26

Personnel
Lyle Lovett - vocals, guitar
Richard Bennett – guitar
Paul Franklin - steel guitar
Ray Herndon - guitar
Deschamps Hood - guitar, background vocals
Billy Williams - guitar
Matt Rollings - piano, Hammond organ
Ben Stivers - piano
Leland Sklar - bass
Andy Laster - sax
Steve Marsh - sax
Paul Leim - drums
John Hagen - cello
Mark O'Connor - fiddle, mandola
David Ball - background vocals
Rodney Crowell - background vocals
Walter Hyatt - background vocals
Mac McAnally - background vocals
Francine Reed - background vocals
Harry Stinson - background vocals
Russ Kunkel - drums

Charts

Weekly charts

Year-end charts

References

1989 albums
Lyle Lovett albums
Albums produced by Tony Brown (record producer)
Curb Records albums
MCA Records albums